Horkelia hispidula is a species of flowering plant in the rose family known by the common name White Mountains horkelia. It is endemic to the White Mountains, a small mountain range that straddles the border between California and Nevada east of the Sierra Nevada. It is a resident of dry scrub and alpine and subalpine forest habitat. This is a perennial herb producing a low mat of hairy, glandular greenish gray foliage about a woody base. The leaves are cylindrical and sometimes taper to a point, growing erect in a patch around the caudex. Each leaf is up to 10 centimeters long and is made up of crowded pairs of hairy leaflets. The inflorescence is an array of up to 15 flowers atop an erect stalk, each flower made up of five hairy, pointed, reflexed sepals and five white petals.

External links
Jepson Manual Treatment
Photo gallery

hispidula
Flora of California
Flora of Nevada
Flora without expected TNC conservation status